Tanner v Tanner [1975] 1 WLR 1346 is an English land law and family law case, concerning implied licenses and constructive trusts in land between cohabiting couples with children.

Facts
Mr Tanner, ‘milkman by day and a croupier by night’, got involved with Miss Macdermott while still married, she had twins girls in 1969 and changed her name to Mrs Tanner, though he never married her. She moved in with him in 1970, giving up her rent controlled tenancy hoping she would remain there until the twins left school. Mr Tanner did divorce his first wife, but then married another woman, and offered Mrs Tanner £4000 to leave, and maintenance that he had not previously paid. She refused. He brought an action to remove her, and succeeded at first instance. She left, and went to a council flat, but appealed, arguing that he was under a contractual duty to allow her to remain until the twins left school, although she merely claimed damages.

Judgment
Lord Denning MR held that the licence could not be terminated, so that Miss Macdermott was entitled to remain in the house. He said as follows.

See also

English trusts law
English land law
English family law

Notes

English land case law
Court of Appeal (England and Wales) cases
1975 in British law
1975 in case law
Lord Denning cases